The Southern Sierra Madre skink (Marisora aquilonaria) is a species of skink found in Mexico.

References

Marisora
Reptiles described in 2020
Taxa named by Stephen Blair Hedges